Cant is a surname. Notable people with the surname include:

 Andrew Cant (educator) (died 1728), Principal of the University of Edinburgh from 1675 to 1685
 Andrew Cant (footballer) (born 1899), Scottish professional footballer
 Andrew Cant (minister) (1590–1663), Presbyterian minister and leader of the Scottish Covenanters
 Brian Cant (1933–2017), British actor and writer
 Colin Cant (f. 1980s), British television producer
 Gilbert Cant (1909–1982), British-born US journalist
 Harry Cant (1907–1977), Australian politician
 Leslie Cant (1908–1943), British footballer
 Richard Cant (f. 1980s), British actor, son of Brian Cant
 Robert Cant (1915–1997), British politician
 Sanne Cant (b. 1990), Belgian cyclist
 William Cant (musician) (1753-1821), English piper
 William Alexander Cant (1863–1933), US federal judge

See also
 Cant (disambiguation)
 Kant (disambiguation)
 Kent (surname)